The 1955–56 Irish Cup was the 76th edition of the premier knock-out cup competition in Northern Irish football. 

Distillery won the cup for the 11th time, defeating Glentoran 1–0 in the second final replay at Windsor Park after the previous two matches ended in draws. 

Dundela were the holders but they were defeated 5-1 by Linfield Swifts in the first round.

Results

First round

|}

Replay

|}

Second replay

|}

Quarter-finals

|}

Replay

|}

Semi-finals

|}

Final

Replay

Second replay

References

External links
The Rec.Sport.Soccer Statistics Foundation - Northern Ireland - Cup Finals

Irish Cup seasons
1955–56 in Northern Ireland association football
1955–56 domestic association football cups